The North Korean Embassy in Madrid incident is an event that occurred on 22 February 2019 at the North Korean embassy in Madrid, Spain. The political group Free Joseon, which is opposed to the incumbent Kim Jong-un government of North Korea, is alleged to have attacked and raided the embassy, while the group maintains that they were invited in to facilitate a high-level defection. A group of individuals stole mobile telephones, two pen drives and a hard drive from the embassy and handed them to the Federal Bureau of Investigation (FBI) in the United States. The event took place after the Singapore summit between North Korea (DPRK) and the United States and prior to the approach of the Hanoi summit. As of early April 2019, one person had been arrested in connection with the incident and two international arrest warrants had been issued by the Spanish Audiencia Nacional. The suspected perpetrators are citizens of Mexico, the US and South Korea, although the latter two governments denied any connection with the incident.

The incident is alleged to have been violent; the suspected perpetrators purportedly possessed knives and replica guns, and a number of embassy staff were treated for injuries. Another member of the embassy staff injured herself by leaping from an upper window before alerting police. The Spanish authorities' investigations were kept secret for the first month; when they released their findings—including the names of the suspected perpetrators—they were criticised for possibly endangering the named peoples' lives. The Spanish privately briefed the media that they suspected but could not prove Central Intelligence Agency (CIA) involvement because the attack was professional in its precision. One former CIA agent, however, said the timing of the attack and its high-profile nature would have made it impossible for the CIA to have condoned it or taken part. The Government of North Korea described the incident as an act of terrorism and demanded an international investigation; the embassy and its attaché, however, did not report the attack or any injuries sustained by the staff to the Spanish police.

Free Joseon has denied allegations that this incident was a break-in raid of the compound, and accusations of being directed by foreign intelligence services. Rather, the group asserts that it was invited in by some undisclosed number of embassy staffers who wished to defect. In order to protect their family members in North Korea, who would ostensibly be punished for a relative's defection, these embassy staffers reportedly requested a staged kidnapping and physical injuries to absolve themselves of suspicion from the North Korean government. It is alleged that a staffer's panic around the plot being discovered precipitated the botched defection effort.

Background

Free Joseon—also known as Cheollima Civil Defense—the group alleged to have carried out the attack, has been described by The Washington Post as a "secretive dissident organization" and a "shadowy group trying to overthrow Kim Jong-un", whose government they claim to be an "immoral and illegitimate regime". Free Joseon is alleged to be composed primarily of North Korean defectors. Two days before the attack the group's website was recruiting field agents, guards and field intelligence agents; the advertisements were tailored towards young people who had previously lived in China and were "willing to devote to the liberation of the North". According to the website, these roles required "insight, intelligence and physical strength". Sung-Yoon Lee of Tufts University said the group "is the first known resistance movement against North Korea, which makes its activities very newsworthy". Greg Scarlatoiu, the executive director of the Committee for Human Rights in North Korea, said "this is the first time we see organized, apparently militant resistance outside of North Korea".

The incident took place just before the US President Donald Trump was due to meet Kim Jong-un for further talks on the DPRK's proposed denuclearisation program; a previous summit held in January 2019 in Hanoi, Vietnam, had failed and relations between North Korea and the US had deteriorated further.

The DPRK's embassy in Madrid, located at 43 Darío Aparicio in the quiet, affluent northern suburb of Aravaca, consists of a two-story "luxurious villa" with a swimming pool and is surrounded by pine trees. The compound is in the middle of a patch of open land that has remained undeveloped because it assists natural drainage for the area. According to El País, since the previous ambassador Kim Hyok-chol was expelled in 2017, only one diplomat and two assistants with their immediate families living a relatively "spartan" existence were resident at the time of the attack. Neighbours, however, reported that a few days prior to the incident, a grand party that had attracted local attention had been held at the embassy.

22 February 2019

On Friday, 22 February 2019, Adrian Hong Chang asked to see the commercial attaché Yun Suk So, who was the embassy's highest-ranking diplomat in residence and with whom Chang claimed to have previous acquaintance. This had occurred two weeks earlier when Hong Chang, using the alias Matthew Chao, managing partner of a fictional company Baron Stone Capital, had a brief meeting with Yuk So regarding the possibility of the company investing in the DPRK.

Once Hong had been admitted to the building, the remaining members of the group allegedly burst in after him; it is possible Hong let them in himself as he waited on an interior patio for the attaché to appear. Ten masked individuals, all but one of whom were below the age of 30, were subsequently described as being Asian in appearance and speaking Korean. They may have congregated on the open land outside the embassy, which would have attracted less attention than loitering near the front entrance, on a main road. The group carried what appeared to be replica firearms, metal bars, machetes and knives. They also brought balaclavas, a  telescopic ladder and 33 rolls of double-sided tape with them.

In contrast to earlier reports, it is possible that the group was invited in by members of the embassy staff to facilitate a high-level defection that would superficially appear as if it were a kidnapping to delude the North Korean government.

There were eight embassy staff members and guests present including a group of North Korean architecture students; all of who were allegedly tied up with ropes, handcuffs and cable ties and hooded with bags. The group allegedly interrogated and assaulted the embassy staff Two staff members later required medical attention, mainly as a result of bruising from multiple, heavy blows. The group appears to have focused primarily on the attaché, whom they tried to persuade to defect and then assaulted when he refused. They also questioned him intensively about Hyok Chol's affairs while he had been resident; eventually they left him tied up in the basement. It is possible that the attache may have been among those who requested a staged assault to facilitate his own defection.

A Korean female member of staff, Cho Sun Hi—who lived in the embassy with her husband—hid in a second-floor room and locked the door. Around an hour into the alleged raid, at about 5 pm, she escaped from the compound by jumping from the window, injuring herself. Sun Hi screamed for help, alerting neighbours who called the police. When the police arrived, they had difficulty in understanding Sun Hi, who spoke no Spanish. They took her to a police station and tried to find an interpreter; eventually they used a translation app on her phone. The police's difficulty in understanding Sun Hi was compounded by a head injury she had sustained. The woman told police "a group of men have entered the embassy and gagged the staff". She described the alleged raiders as commandos. It was later established that in "police chat groups", Sun Hi's mental stability had been questioned.

The police returned to the embassy and attempted entry. Hong Chang, whom they assumed to be a member of staff because he was wearing a Kim Il-sung–Kim Jong-il badge, answered the door and assured them there was nothing untoward occurring. Diplomatic law forbids police from entering the premises without authorisation from the head of the mission, which was not to be gained, so they kept watch outside and set up a security perimeter. The police saw other men, whom they identified as they waited to enter, arrive.

Meanwhile, the group ransacked the building, filming themselves as they did so. They collected most of the embassy's electronic equipment, including computers, mobile telephones, hard drives and pen drives. Soon after the police were called, the embassy gates suddenly opened and two or three "luxury" cars containing eight of the intruders exited at speed; the police did not follow. These cars were later established to be embassy vehicles with diplomatic numberplates; they were found abandoned a few streets away hours later and were removed for forensic examination. Another car with Hong Chang in it apparently left from the rear of the building soon after; it later transpired this was an Uber taxi he had ordered in the name of Oswaldo Trump. The group took all of the stolen electronic equipment with them.

The incident lasted for about five hours; it began at 16:34 CET and had ended by 21:40. During this time, Free Joseon "remained in full control" of the embassy and its occupants, even after the escape. An incident is alleged to have taken place at the door, although early suggestions a death had occurred were unfounded. When the SAMUR paramedics arrived, they treated three injured.

Investigation 

Despite the incident not being reported by the embassy or its staff, it was investigated by Spanish authorities. Although officially they only acknowledged "something happened", political espionage was recognised early in the investigation as a possible motive. Common criminality was excluded as a motive for the incident, which was described by investigators as having the hallmarks of a cell in the attack's "perfectly coordinated" military precision. It was, said investigators, probably carried out by professionals who knew precisely what they were looking for before they attacked. Investigators said the gang must have been responsible for lowering the power and dimming the street lights in the road at the front of the embassy; other security systems around the building were also found to have been neutralised.

The investigation, which was described as "highly secret", was carried out by officers of the Provincial Information Brigade of the Spanish National Police, answering to Court 5 of the Audiencia Nacional (National Court), which had the authority to order the arrest of those who had then been named. The Guardia Civil and the CNI carried out parallel investigations, each focusing on different theories.

It was uncertain the Free Joseon members were aware of the embassy's business that day and may have been surprised by the guests' presence. Witnesses suggested the members were South Korean. Police visited the South Korean embassy to see if any of the staff could be identified. A few days later, the South Korean Ambassador Chun Hong-jo wrote to El Mundo denying his government's involvement in the affair. A spokeswoman for the South Korean embassy stated that "we do not know anything, we can not say anything else, we heard about the assault by the press, the police did not come here".

Kim Hyok-chol 
The previous DPRK Ambassador to Spain Kim Hyok-chol had been expelled by the Spanish Government in September 2017 in response to North Korea's continued testing of nuclear missiles in defiance of the international community. Although persona non-grata in Spain, Kim returned to the DPRK to become one of the architects of Kim Jong-un's diplomacy with the US, including the failed Vietnam summit. Analyst Andrei Lankov describes Kim Hyok-chol as Stephen Biegun's North Korean counterpart.

Little is known in the West of Kim Hyok-chol's personality or career. It was noted that the computers and telephones that were seized by the attackers would be a "treasure trove" to intelligence services around the world for the information and communications they probably contained, and would be "eagerly sought after". Obtaining private information on Kim Hyok-chol,who has been described as "a natural target" for those interested in the DPRK's nuclear program, and information on North Korea's re-armament program may have been the purpose of the attack.

Tufts University professor Sung-Yoon Lee believed it likely the seized materials could contain valuable information about any recent plans by the DPRK to evade the sanctions against its government, claims that were repeated on Fox News by Gordon G. Chang. Noting that Kim Hyok-chol had been recalled from Spain to lead North Korea's negotiations, Lee suggested any information held on those computers, including information on his activities in Spain, would have helped the US and its allies "to gain an edge in the negotiations" in Hanoi. For the Free Jeoson group, securing such top-secret information would "enhance their own status".

Later events 
Following their escape, the group split into four groups and made their ways to Portugal and then to the US. Hong Chang flew from Lisbon Airport to Newark Liberty the day after the attack.

On 14 March, El Mundo reported that at about midnight on 22 February, Spanish police had surrounded the embassy compound and blocked all of the approaches. They entered the building and performed a visual search, in the course of which they found a substantial cache of automatic weaponry consisting mainly of rifles and shotguns, but also short arms. The paper's source speculated these were the weapons the intruders had used and had dumped before leaving.

On 26 March, Judge José de la Mata lifted the injunction suppressing public knowledge of the case because the group had by then publicly "identified themselves as members of a human rights movement seeking to liberate North Korea". The court statement also stated that Hong Chang had acted without state assistance, and the group's statement later reiterated the point. Lee Wolosky, the lawyer representing Free Joseon, disputed the legitimacy of the judge's conclusions, saying he had reached them without any evidence from the accused themselves. He also accused de la Mata of irresponsibility in releasing the names of individuals engaged in "opposition to a brutal regime that routinely and summarily executes its enemies". The group also denied weapons or violence had been used in the incident.

Free Joseon subsequently stated on their website they had "received a request for help from comrades in a certain Western country" that involved "a highly dangerous situation". On 27 March 2019, they accepted responsibility for the incident in question, claimed responsibility for a graffiti attack on the DPRK embassy in Kuala Lumpur early the following month and warned of a "spectacular" in the near future, saying, "the Kim Jong-un regime will continue to feel humiliated if it rejects the order of freedom".

The North Korean government did not make a public comment until 37 days later, when the foreign ministry called the assault a "grave terrorist attack" and suggested FBI involvement. The government demanded an investigation into an "act of extortion" by a "small-fry organisation" that Korean Central News Agency said "should never be tolerated". They said they would wait patiently and acknowledge the Spanish investigation in line with international law, although former North Korean diplomat Thae Yong-ho said the DPRK government would be "putting pressure" on Spain over the incident. They also said their embassy staff had been tortured, and the DPRK summoned their ambassadors to Russia, the United States and the United Nations back to Pyongyang. According to Thae Yong-ho, this reflects the importance the regime places on its decryption software.

A further two members of the group were subsequently named; Sam Ryu, a US citizen and Woo Ran Lee from South Korea. Hong Chang, a resident of the US but a citizen of Mexico, apparently telephoned the FBI on 27 February—the opening day of the US/DPRK summit—to make a statement giving the assailants' view of events. The group subsequently announced they had "shared information of enormous potential value under mutually agreed terms of confidentiality" with the FBI, handing over everything they had taken from the embassy, including audiovisual material. The statement also denied anyone had been beaten or gagged. The FBI refused to deny or confirm the existence of the material or whether it was part of an investigation, although they emphasised the "good, working relationship" the Bureau enjoys with its Spanish counterpart. US news sources reported that the information received by the FBI from an anonymous ex-intelligence officer was "pretty significant". A video claimed to have been filmed during the incident was uploaded to the group's website and to YouTube; it shows individuals smashing portraits of leading members of the North Korean regime.

Despite the group's claims of confidential agreements with the FBI, soon after they handed over the stolen materials, details of the event appeared in the American press, publicly linking the group with the embassy incident. Free Joseon said the media coverage amounted to a "betrayal of trust" and a "breach of confidentiality" by the FBI, which they said had requested their intelligence and had been given it voluntarily. The group said "speculative" press reporting would endanger its members from North Korean retaliation. Free Joseon failed to gain immunity from prosecution for its members who had been involved in the incident; journalist Laura Bicker notes that Hong Chang is "undoubtedly a wanted man" by the Spanish High Court and probably by Pyongyang. In a subsequent statement, the Cheollima Civil Defense website stated, "parties seeking to 'out' those in Madrid have painted a target on the backs of those seeking only to protect others ... they have chosen to side with Pyongyang's criminal, totalitarian rulers over their victims".

The US authorities issued an arrest warrant for Adrian Hong on 9 April 2019 while Christopher Ahn, one of perpetrators, was arrested on 18 April that year.

Reactions

News outlets said neither the embassy nor any of the affected staff made an official report or complaint to the Spanish police, although one woman, who is thought to be the one who had escaped, said she had been assaulted.

There was little reaction to the incident, even in South Korea, until mid-March 2019 when Free Joseon's involvement was first alleged. The respective governments made no public comment on the incident until Spanish daily newspaper El País reported that at least two of the perpetrators had links to the CIA. BBC News reported that because of "the US and North Korea striving to improve relations after nearly 70 years of hostility, such allegations could be explosive". El Confidencial said if the CIA's involvement was proven, it would have been working with other western intelligence agencies. The CIA is known to work closely with defector organisations, according to the Financial Times, with the caveat that such work "does not, in itself, prove CIA involvement in the Madrid episode". Other commentators, such as Bruce Bennett of the RAND Corporation, said sponsoring an embassy invasion—in light of the number of US embassies—would set a dangerous precedent. Spanish government sources acknowledged that even if their suspicions about CIA involvement were accurate it would be difficult to prove the allegations in court.

At a news briefing, Robert Palladino of the US State Department denied any involvement in the alleged raid by any part of the government.

Citing unnamed Spanish police investigators and officials from the National Intelligence Center and the General Information Office, El Mundo speculated information could also have emanated from within the embassy to the group. The police said this would explain the precision of the attackers; the paper pointed to other occasions in which North Korea had attacked its own diplomatic staff, such as the former North Korean ambassador to Rome who had disappeared in January 2018.

Sources whom The Washington Post described as "familiar with the incident" denied the involvement of intelligence agencies, however, saying they would have been unwilling to involve themselves in such a high-profile incident at a critical juncture in US–DPRK relations. Anonymous Spanish government officials, however, reported in El País, stated that they were not convinced by the CIA's claim.

According to Spanish news sources, if the CIA was subsequently discovered to have been involved in the attack, this would damage US relations with the DPRK and Spain, and would be considered an unprovoked and unrequested incursion against Spanish sovereignty and the accepted norms of international diplomacy. Evidence of CIA involvement would cause an "uproar" in North Korea.

The identities and nationalities of the Free Joseon members were called "particularly sensitive" in light of the delicate relations between the US and North Korea at the time. The appearance of being involved with an invasion of extraterritorial immunity. Judge de la Mata issued international arrest warrants for Hong Chang and Ryu in March 2019, and stated that he would be formally request their extradition when they were served. NBC News said it was unclear whether the Spanish authority's own investigation had revealed the identities of those involved or whether the US had passed them the information.

According to DPRK defector Thae Yong-ho, the computer equipment taken by the group could have included decryption software essential for secure communications between Pyongyang and its embassies and missions. Known as the "transformation computer", Yong-ho said to the DPRK leadership it was "considered more important than human lives" due to the perception that its code was unbreakable.

In contrast to early speculation, according to investigative journalist Suki Kim who had been investigating Free Joseon for over a year, the group has been at odds with intelligence agencies such as the CIA, which intervened against Cheollima Civil Defense's efforts to protect Kim Han Sol and escort him to safety following the assassination of his father in 2017. Likewise, the South Korean intelligence services would likely oppose a group such as Free Joseon given the South Korean government's non-recognition of North Korean sovereignty in its constitution.

Notes

References

Bibliography 

 
 
 
 
 
 
 
 
 
 
 
 
 
 
 
Hope, Bradley (2022). The Rebel and the Kingdom: The True Story of the Secret Mission to Overthrow the North Korean Regime. Crown. ISBN 9780593240656.

External links
 

2019 in Madrid
Politics of North Korea
North Korea–Spain relations
Diplomatic incidents